Bāṇabhaṭṭa was a 7th-century Sanskrit prose writer and poet of India. He was the Asthana Kavi in the court of the emperor Harsha, who reigned c. 606–647 CE in north India, first from Sthanvishvara (Thanesar), and later Kannauj. Bāna's principal works include a biography of Harsha, the Harshacharita (Deeds of Harsha), and one of the world's earliest novels, Kadambari. Bāṇa died before finishing the novel and it was completed by his son Bhūṣaṇabhaṭṭa. Both these works are noted texts of Sanskrit literature. The other works attributed to him are the Caṇḍikāśataka and a drama, the Pārvatīpariṇaya. Banabhatta gets an applause as "banochhistam jagatsarvam" meaning Bana has described everything in this world and nothing is left.

Biography
A detailed account regarding his ancestry and early life can be reconstructed from the introductory verses attached to the Kadambari and the first two ucchāvasas of the Harṣacarita, while the circumstances behind the composition of the Harṣacarita are described in the third ucchāvasa of the text. Harsacarita is considered as the first Indian work which may be regarded as a historical biography. It gives a vivid picture of life in the countryside.

Bāna was born to Chitrabhānu and Rājadevi in the village of Pritikuta on the banks of the Hiraṇyavāhu in a Bhojaka family of Vātsyāyana gotra in the current district of Aurangabad in modern-day Bihar. After the death of his father, Bāṇa led a wandering life for a period but later came back to his native village. Here, on a summer day, on receiving a letter from Krishna, a cousin of King Harsha, he met the king while he was camping near the town of Manitara. After receiving Bāna with mock signs of anger, the king showed him much favor.

Works

 
 Bana (tr. G. Layne), Bāṇabhaṭṭa Kādambarī. A Classic Sanskrit Story of Magical Transformations (New York: Garland, 1991).
Harshacharita :The Harshacharita (Sanskrit: हर्षचरित, Harṣacarita) (The deeds of Harsha), is the biography of Indian emperor Harsha by Banabhatta, also known as Bana, who was a Sanskrit writer of seventh-century CE India. He was the Asthana Kavi, meaning Court Poet, of Harsha. The Harshacharita was the first composition of Bana and is considered to be the beginning of the writing of historical poetic works in the Sanskrit language.

References

 The Harsacharita of Bana. Translated by E. B. Cowell and F. W. Thomas.  London: Royal Asiatic Society, 1897, 4-34.

Biography

External links
 
  
 

Sanskrit writers
Scholars from Bihar
History of Bihar
Sanskrit poets
7th-century Indian biographers
7th-century Indian poets
Indian male novelists
Indian male poets
7th-century Indian novelists
Male biographers